Kimberly or Kimberley may refer to:

Places and historical events

Australia
 Kimberley (Western Australia)
 Kimberley Warm Springs, Tasmania
 Kimberley, Tasmania a small town
 County of Kimberley, a cadastral unit in South Australia
 Kimberley Marine Park, a marine protected area

Canada
 Kimberley, British Columbia, Canada

New Zealand
 Kimberley, New Zealand

South Africa
 Kimberley, Northern Cape, South Africa
 Roman Catholic Diocese of Kimberley 
 Siege of Kimberley (1899–1900), event during the Second Boer War

United Kingdom 
 Kimberley, Norfolk
 Kimberley, Nottinghamshire

United States 
 Kimberly, Arkansas
 Kimberly, Alabama, city
 Kimberly Mansion, a historic house in Connecticut
 Kimberly, Idaho, city
 Kimberly, Minnesota
 Kimberly Township, Aitkin County, Minnesota
 Kimberly, Missouri, unincorporated community
 Kimberly, Nevada, ghost town
 Kimberly, Oregon, unincorporated community
 Kimberly, Utah, abandoned town
 Kimberly, Fayette County, West Virginia, unincorporated community
 Kimberly, Monongalia County, West Virginia, unincorporated community
 Kimberly, Wisconsin, village

People 
 Kimberly (given name) (Kimberly and Kimberley)
 Kimberley (surname) (Kimberley and Kimberly)
 Earl of Kimberley, peerage in the United Kingdom

Ships 
 , K-class destroyer of the Royal Navy 
 SAS Kimberley (M1210), ex–HMS Stratton, Ton-class minesweeper, sold to South Africa in 1959 and renamed Kimberley
 , destroyer (1917–37) of the U.S. Navy
 , destroyer (1942–67) of the U.S. Navy

Sports 
 Kimberley de Mar del Plata or Club Atlético Kimberley, a sports club based in Mar del Plata, Argentina
 Kimberley Atlético Club, a sports club based in Villa Devoto, Buenos Aires, Argentina 
 Kimberley Dynamiters (disambiguation), several Canadian ice hockey teams

Other uses 
 Kimberley Declaration, a 2002 statement regarding protection of traditional indigenous knowledge systems
 Kimberley Process Certification Scheme, to certify the origin of rough diamonds
 Kimberley (album), by Kimberley Chen, 2012
 "Kimberly", a song by Patti Smith from Horses, 1975
 Kimberly, a biscuit produced by Jacob Fruitfield Food Group

See also 
 Kimberly-Clark, U.S. producer of paper-based consumer products
 Duffner and Kimberly, U.S. lamp manufacturers